Hectobrocha pentacyma, the five-banded footman, is a moth of the subfamily Arctiinae. It was described by Edward Meyrick in 1886. It is found in the Australian states of Queensland, New South Wales and Victoria.

References

Lithosiini
Moths described in 1886